Carlos Romero (7 September 1927 – 28 July 1999) was a Uruguayan footballer, who played for Danubio.

For the Uruguay national football team, he was part of the 1950 FIFA World Cup winning team, but did not play in any matches in the tournament. In total he earned 11 caps and scored 4 goals for Uruguay.

References

External links
World Cup Champions Squads 1930 - 2002
A primeira grande zebra do Mundial (in Spanish)
Uruguay - Record International Players

1927 births
Uruguayan footballers
Uruguay international footballers
1950 FIFA World Cup players
FIFA World Cup-winning players
Uruguayan Primera División players
Danubio F.C. players
1999 deaths

Association football forwards